Herschel Girls School is a private, weekly boarding and day school for girls, located in Claremont, a southern suburb of Cape Town, Western Cape, South Africa. The school has pre-nursery through to grade 12 and is affiliated with the Anglican church, which owns the school buildings.

The school, described as "one of the country's best-known schools for girls", is one of the top performing schools in South Africa, achieving the highest academic results in the country for National Senior Certificate exams in 2019. The purpose of Herschel Girls School is and always has been to provide an empowering education for girls and to be a leader in girls’ education and advocacy for women in South Africa. Herschel Girls School is one of the most expensive schools in South Africa. There are waiting lists for every grade, including pre-nursery.

History 
Herschel was established in February 1922. The property belonged to VA Schonnberg, who, when he sold the main estate in 1834 to the astronomer Sir John Herschel, retained this portion of land and named it after his illustrious neighbour. In July 1921, the estate was bought by The English Church Schools Association, with the aid of a generous loan from John William Jagger, to provide for the needs of the many girls living in the Southern Suburbs who wished to attend a private school. The first Headmistress was Miss Morley Armitage Ralph, and the school opened on Wednesday, 1 February 1922, when the first seven boarders arrived. On the following day, Thursday, the roll call was taken and the first school day began with prayers led by Archbishop Carter. There were twenty-nine girls on the roll and seven staff members. Herschel’s first head girl was Enid Harsant. The formal opening was held two weeks later, on Thursday, 16 February 1922 and we still celebrate our Founder’s Day on the Friday closest to 16 February. 

The Honourable William Jagger would take delight in the proud institution that Herschel has become today. It is a school that enables its pupils to attain high academic achievement and become citizens who are able to make a difference in the society they enter. Although the school has a long tradition, it has remained innovative and relevant to changing educational needs.

Notable alumnae 
 Alide Dasnois, journalist and newspaper editor
 Margaret Elsworth, founder of the African Scholars' Fund and the African Scholars' Fund UK
 Sue MacGregor, BBC Radio 4 broadcaster
 Diana E. H. Russell, feminist scholar and activist
 Pauline Vogelpoel, arts administrator
Zoe Beyers, BBC Philharmonic concertmaster
Kayla de Waal, South African field hockey player

See also 
 List of boarding schools

References

External links 
 

Anglican schools in South Africa
Boarding schools in South Africa
Schools in Cape Town
Private schools in the Western Cape
Girls' schools in South Africa
Educational institutions established in 1922
1922 establishments in South Africa